Hassan (pronounced: Haasana) is a city in Hassan taluk and headquarters of Hassan district, in southern part of Karnataka.

The urban population in 2011 was 133,436.

Hassan city gets its name from the Hindu goddess Hassanamba.

History 
Hassan dates from beginnings of the Hoysala Empire in the 11th century. Hoysala Empire ruled this city for a long time and their influence can be seen in the art and inscriptions on the different monuments such as in Halebidu, Belur and Shravanabelagola. After these medieval ages, Hassan became famous again because of Dinesh Pattanashettaru

Demographics 

 Indian census, the city of Hassan had an urban population of 133,436. Males were 49.5% of the population and females 50.5%. The average literacy rate was 80.8%. Male literacy was 82.7%, and female literacy was 78.9%. Of the population, 10.1% was under the age of 7. After expanding city limits, the population increased to 226,520.

Gallery

Climate 
Tropical savanna climates have monthly mean temperature above 18 °C (64 °F) in every month of the year and typically a pronounced dry season, with the driest month having precipitation less than 60 mm (2.36 in) of precipitation. According to the Köppen Climate Classification,  Hassan has a tropical savanna climate (Aw).

See also 
Hassan District
Manjarabad Fort, a star fort from 1792
 Shravanabelagola
 Belur
 Sakleshpur
 Mangalore
 Halebidu
 Saligrama, Mysore

References

External links

Cities and towns in Hassan district
Cities in Karnataka